Jeet Gannguli (born Chandrajeet Ganguly, on 24 May 1977), is an Indian score composer of Bengali and Hindi movies.

Early life and education
Born in a Bengali Brahmin family, Gannguli was initiated into the world of music at the age of three. He was a student of Baranagore Ramakrishna Mission Ashrama High School from where he completed his schooling. Later he graduated from the University of Calcutta. He is trained in Indian classical music under the guidance of his father Kali Ganguly and his pisima (father's sister) Shibani Roychowdhury. He studied western classical music, jazz and rock with jazz guitarist Carlton Kitto.

Career
Gannguli got his first break when Sanjay Gadhvi was signed on to direct Tere Liye and he, in turn, signed on his friends Jeet Gannguli and Pritam as music composers. In 2002 Yash Raj Films signed Gadhvi up to direct Mere Yaar Ki Shaadi Hai, for which the Gannguli-Pritam duo composed the music.

He then started scoring music for Hindi and Bengali films, TV serials and Jingles.

Discography

Select discography
 "Suno Na Sangemarmar" from Youngistaan
 "Teri Khushboo" from Mr. X
 "Baatein Ye Kabhi Na" from Khamoshiyan
 "Chahun Main Ya Naa" from Aashiqui 2
 "Muskurane" from CityLights
 "Bol Naa Aar" from Dui Prithibi
Babloo Bachelor

Awards and nominations

Bengali Cinema Awards

Hindi Cinema Awards

See also
 List of Indian film music directors

References

External links

 
 
 
 Jeet Ganguly first time working with Pandit Ajoy Chakroborty in a Bengali film Bhorer Allo produced by Green Pigeon Movies

 
Music directors
Bengali Hindus
Musicians from Kolkata
Indian guitarists
Living people
Filmfare Awards winners
Ramakrishna Mission schools alumni
University of Calcutta alumni
1977 births
Bengali film score composers
21st-century Indian composers
Hindi film score composers
People from Baranagar
Baranagore Ramakrishna Mission Ashrama High School alumni